Loophole is the second album by Sketch Show.

Track listing

Personnel
Haruomi Hosono & Yukihiro Takahashi - Arranging, Mixing, Production
Ryuichi Sakamoto - Mixing, Production ("Mars", "Attention Tokyo")
Chiho Shibaoka - Swedish Voice ("Mars", "Wiper", "Chronograph" "Attention Tokyo", "Ekot")
Hiroshi Haraguchi - Mixing, Recording Engineer
Yasuo Kimoto - Mixing ("Plankton", "Fly Me to the River")
Safety Scissors - Mixing ("Night Talker")
Cornelius - Mixing ("Ekot")
Tomohiko Gondo - Euphonium ("Ekot")
Meg - Lyrics ("Flakes", "Traum 6.6", "Stella")
Tom Coyne - Mastering
Takashi Okada (Zubai Studio) - Art Direction, Design
Daisy Creatures - Photography

External links

2003 albums
Avex Group albums
Sketch Show (band) albums